The Saint Louis Billikens football team represented Saint Louis University in the sport of college football. The university fielded an intercollegiate squad from 1899 to 1949, going undefeated in 1901, 1904 and 1906. The final home game for the Billikens was on November 24, 1949, a 35–0 loss against Houston. Saint Louis finished the 1949 season with a 2–6–1 record. St. Louis competed at the club level during the late 1960s and early 1970s.

Although the school no longer has a football team, they made a lasting mark on the sport as the 1906 team, coached by Eddie Cochems, threw the first legal forward pass in college football history, Bradbury Robinson to Jack Schneider on September 5, 1906, vs. Carroll College at Waukesha, Wisconsin.

Seasons

See also
 Saint Louis Billikens

References

 
American football teams established in 1899
American football teams disestablished in 1949
1899 establishments in Missouri
1949 disestablishments in Missouri